The Queer Zine Archive Project (QZAP) is a Milwaukee-based  community archive dedicated to preserving queer zines and queer zine culture. Part of the archive's mission is to make the collection accessible through digitizing these zines and making them publicly accessible in an online format. The archive has received zine donations from across the world. QZAP has been noted by University of Milwaukie professor Joyce Latham as a powerful "response of the queer community to the history, and practice, of marginalization and disregard."

QZAP was founded in November 2003 by Milo Miller and Chris Wilde. It has since maintained a physical collection in Milwaukee and a free online archive of digitized zines.

Mission statement

Collections
QZAP began when its founders digitized their personal collection of roughly 350 queer-punk zines and put them in an online database. Through donations, the collection has (as of July 2018) grown to over 2,500 zines, nearly 600 of which have been digitized and are freely accessible online. The physical collection is stored in filing cabinets in the founders' Milwaukee home.

Digitized items from the QZAP collection also form part of the Zines collection at the Digital Transgender Archive. Miller and Wilde have explained that they digitize zines to further diversify queer stories, stating that they want to make more public "stories aren’t being told in other ways."

See also

LGBT Museums and Archives
LGBT history in the United States
Queercore
DIY culture

References

External links
Official website
QZAP online archive

LGBT museums and archives
Archives in the United States